Strategic fit expresses the degree to which an organization is matching its resources and capabilities with the opportunities in the external environment. The matching takes place through strategy and it is therefore vital that the company has the actual resources and capabilities to execute and support the strategy. Strategic fit can be used actively to evaluate the current strategic situation of a company as well as opportunities such as mergers and acquisitions (M&A) and divestitures of organizational divisions. Strategic fit is related to the resource-based view of the firm which suggests that the key to profitability is not only through positioning and industry selection but rather through an internal focus which seeks to utilize the unique characteristics of the company's portfolio of resources and capabilities. A unique combination of resources and capabilities can eventually be developed into a competitive advantage which the company can profit from. However, it is important to differentiate between resources and capabilities. Resources relate to the inputs to production owned by the company, whereas capabilities describe the accumulation of learning the company possesses.

Class
Resources can be classified both as tangible and intangible: 

Tangible:
Financial (cash, securities)
Physical (Location, plant, machinery)

Intangible:
Technology (patents, copyrights)
Human resources (tacit knowledge)
Reputation (Brands)
Culture

Several tools have been developed one can use in order to analyze the resources and capabilities of a company. These include SWOT, value chain analysis, cash flow analysis and more. Benchmarking with relevant peers is a tool to assess the relative strengths of the resources and capabilities of the company compared to its competitors. 

Strategic fit can also be used to evaluate specific opportunities like M&A opportunities. The strategic fit would, in this case, refer to how well the potential acquisition fits with the planned direction (strategy) of the acquiring company. In order to justify growth through M&A transactions the transaction should yield a better return than organic growth. The differential efficiency theory states that the acquiring firm will be able to increase its efficiency in the areas where the acquired firm is superior. In addition, the theory argues that M&A transactions give the acquiring firm the possibility of achieving positive synergy effects meaning that the two merged companies are worth more together than the sums of their parts individually. This is because merging companies may enjoy from economies of scale and economies of scope.  However, in reality, many M&A transactions fail due to different factors, one of them being lack of strategic fit. A CEO survey conducted by Bain & Company in 1997 showed that 94% of the interviewed CEO's considered the strategic fit to be vitally influential in the success or failure of an acquisition. A high degree of strategic fit from can potentially yield many benefits for an organization. Best case scenario a high degree of strategic fit may be the key to a successful merger, an efficient organization, synergy effects or cost reductions. It is a vital term and it should be taken into consideration when evaluating a company's strategy and opportunities.

References

Strategic management